There were different kinds of now retired Satellite Awards including Sports Games given as an annual award by the International Press Academy, such as

 Satellite Award for Outstanding Sports Game (2004 & 2006)
 Satellite Award for Outstanding Sports/Fighting/Racing Game (2005)
 Satellite Award for Outstanding Sports/Racing Game (2008 & 2011-2013 & 2016)
 Satellite Award for Outstanding Sports/Rhythm/Music Game (2007)

Furthermore, there was only one non-sports related Satellite Award referring to Music Games in 2008:

 Satellite Award for Outstanding Music/Rhythm Game

Winners and nominees

Outstanding Sports/Other Game

Outstanding Music/Rhythm Game

References

External links
 International Press Academy website

Satellite Awards